Dakkili is a village located in the Dakkili mandal of Tirupati district of Andhra Pradesh, India. It is located near the border of Nellore district and Annamayya district

References

Villages in Nellore district